The World's Largest Tuned Musical Windchime was erected by windchime artist, Ranaga Farbiarz, in the parking area of Celestial Windz Harmonic Bizaar, south of Eureka Springs, Arkansas on Thursday, November 4, 2004.

Construction
The chime is dedicated to Ranaga's late father, Ignatz Farbiarz, a Holocaust Survivor.	

The six metal pipes are tuned in an Oriental pentatonic scale, like the black keys on a piano, with the longest and  shortest tubes emitting notes an octave apart.

The instrument is made from four-inch (102 mm)  diameter, thick-walled aluminum tubing. The total weight of the chime is 653 pounds with the musical tubing alone weighing 310 pounds. The  by  wooden pyramidal shaped top weighs 225 pounds. The center hung circular wood knocker is 3' 6" in diameter and weighs 64 pounds. The down rods and miscellaneous hardware weigh 36 pounds. Ranaga calls it the "Wind Chime of Mass 
Distraction" (WMD) because it is made with the same size and grade aluminum sought by the weapons inspectors in Iraq.

Farbiarz was notified via a formal letter, dated Feb. 9th 2006, from the Guinness World Records Management Team.  The letter conveyed the Guinness Team's congratulations upon Farbiarz's achievement of the world record of the largest set of windchimes, and was accompanied by a certificate of commemoration.

See also
 World's largest windchime

References

External links
 Wind Chime Puts Arkansas Town in Guiness [sic] Records from National Public Radio

Idiophones
Superlatives
Buildings and structures in Eureka Springs, Arkansas
2004 establishments in Arkansas